New York Mountain is a mountain in Eagle County, Colorado. Gold Dust Peak lies south of New York Mountain and New York Lake is located southeast. The New York Mountain Trail leads to the summit. The mountain is the site of mining ruins from the late nineteenth century.

References

Mountains of Colorado
Mountains of Eagle County, Colorado
North American 3000 m summits